"Water" is the second episode of season 1 of the re-imagined Battlestar Galactica television series.

Plot

In the fleet
Boomer wakes up in the tool room of the Galactica hangar deck, soaking wet. Inside of her bag she finds a G-4 explosive and a towel. Upon emerging from the tool room, Boomer learns from Cally that its early morning, not evening as she believes. Returning the detonator to the arms locker, Boomer finds out that six others are missing and becomes panicked.

At the same time President Laura Roslin makes a ceremonial visit to the Galactica. While Roslin believes that Commander William Adama wants the ceremony to feel more comfortable, Apollo changes her opinion on the matter by revealing that Adama hates ceremonial events and was only doing it because he thought it made Roslin feel presidential. While Roslin is on board, the Galactica begins transferring potable water to the Virgon Express, a ship that relies on Galactica for its water supply.

As the Galactica transfers the water to the Virgon Express, a panicked Boomer informs Chief Galen Tyrol of her discovery. Boomer is further panicked due to rumors of Cylons taking on human form and Cylon sleeper agents in the fleet. As the water transfer occurs, several explosions vent the Galactica's portside water tanks to space, venting 60% of Galactica's water supplies. Even with rationing, it's quickly determined that Galactica will run out of water in six days. With one-third of the fleet relying on Galactica for their water, they will run out within two days. A mission is quickly launched to search five nearby star systems for sources of water.

The subsequent investigation by Tyrol determines that five explosives were used to blow out the tanks and that there is still one detonator missing. The command staff quickly realize that there is a Cylon agent aboard Galactica. Roslin and Adama turn to Doctor Gaius Baltar to identify the agent. In the past Baltar had claimed to find a way of detecting Cylon agents that had allowed him to "identify" Aaron Doral as a Cylon. Baltar quickly makes excuses about why his testing method is no longer viable and Adama assigns Lieutenant Felix Gaeta to assist Baltar. To buy himself some time, Baltar joins a card game led by Starbuck, with whom he unsuccessfully flirts.

With all of the other searches having failed to turn up water, Boomer and her ECO Crashdown search the last system for water. While Crashdown comes up with nothing, Boomer's scans reveal water on the moon they are investigating. However, the last detonator is attached to an explosive on the side of Boomer's seat and Boomer's Cylon programming attempts to compel her to detonate the bomb rather than reveal the existence of the water. Boomer manages to overcome her programming and announces the discovery of a source of water.

Back in the fleet, Boomer and Crashdown are greeted as heroes for their success. Boomer discreetly alerts Tyrol of the bomb in her Raptor; he removes it and gives it to the master-at-arms, claiming to have found it during routine maintenance. Though Tyrol is sure of Boomer's innocence, Boomer remains disturbed by the implications of everything that has happened.

Throughout these events, Apollo remains disturbed by his destruction of the Olympic Carrier three days prior. Roslin comforts Apollo and requests that he be her special military advisor. Roslin's misunderstanding of Adama's intentions with her ceremonial visit, and Apollo's clearing it up for her, have demonstrated to Roslin that she knows very little about the military and needs someone to help keep such misunderstandings from happening in the future.

On Caprica
Helo and the copy of Boomer return to "Boomer's" Raptor to find it swarming with Cylon Centurions. Unable to escape the planet this way, they are forced to retreat to search for another way off of Caprica.

That night, while camping in a forest, Helo and the Boomer copy discuss why she (supposedly) disobeyed orders to come back for Helo. The Boomer copy claims that she couldn't bring herself to leave Helo behind. At this point in their conversation, they detect a military signal on Helo's radio. While it is indecipherable, the two realize that it means that there are military units still active somewhere on Caprica, and intend to search for them.

External links
"Water" at the Battlestar Wiki
 "Water" at Syfy
 

2004 American television episodes
Battlestar Galactica (season 1) episodes
Television episodes written by Ronald D. Moore
Water scarcity in fiction

it:Episodi di Battlestar Galactica (prima stagione)#Acqua